Bangladesh Energy Regulatory Commission or BERC, is a regulatory agency that regulates the gas, electricity and petroleum products in Bangladesh and is located in Dhaka, Bangladesh.

History
The commission was created in 2004 and is responsible for the setting up of gas and electricity prices in Bangladesh. Its also arbitrates disputes in the energy industry. Its approval is need for any changes in the price of electricity. The Energy Security Fund is under this agency.

Current Commission 

The Chairman of the Commission receives the rank of Justice of the Appellate Division of the Supreme Court and other members receive the rank, salary and other ancillary benefits as determined by the Government.

References

Government agencies of Bangladesh
Organisations based in Dhaka
2004 establishments in Bangladesh
Energy regulatory authorities
Energy in Bangladesh
Regulators of Bangladesh
Government commissions of Bangladesh